The 2021 Italian GT Championship was the 30th season of the Italian GT Championship, the grand tourer-style sports car racing founded by the Italian automobile club (Automobile Club d'Italia). The Championship consists of four Sprint race events and four Endurance race events. At each Sprint race event there were held two races. The Season started on 1 May at Monza and ended on 31 October at Monza.

Calendar

Teams and Drivers

GT3

GT Cup

GT4

Results
Bold indicates the overall winner.

References

Italian Motorsports Championships
Italian GT Championship